Rhynchobatus immaculatus, the Taiwanese wedgefish, is a species of fish in the family Rhinidae. 
It is found in the Pacific Ocean in the vicinity of Taiwan.

References

immaculatus
Marine fauna of Southeast Asia
Taxa named by Peter R. Last
Taxa named by Hans Hsuan-Ching Ho
Taxa named by Chen Rou-Rong
Fish described in 2010
Taxonomy articles created by Polbot